Géza Mészöly may refer to:

Géza Mészöly (painter) (1844–1887), Hungarian painter
Géza Mészöly (footballer) (born 1967), Hungarian footballer
Géza Mészöly (sport shooter) (1876–1919), Hungarian shooter